Mark Wood may refer to:

Sir Mark Wood, 1st Baronet (1750–1829), British Member of Parliament for Newark, Milborne Port and Gatton
Mark Wood (bishop) (1919–2014), Bishop of Matabeleland and Bishop of Ludlow
Mark Wood (businessman) (born 1953), British businessman
Mark Wood (cricketer) (born 1990), English cricketer
Mark Wood (explorer) (born 1967), British Arctic and Antarctic explorer
Mark Wood (footballer) (born 1972), English professional footballer
Mark Wood (Medal of Honor) (1839–1866), American Civil War Medal of Honor recipient
Mark Wood (violinist), electric violinist and former string master of the Trans-Siberian Orchestra

See also
Mark Woods (disambiguation)
Markwood, West Virginia